Jayasena Dissanayake was a Sri Lankan politician who belonged to the United National Party. He was the Mayor of  Anuradhpura and later the  Chief Minister  of North Central Province in Sri Lanka from May 1996 to June 1998 after which the council was dissolved and elections postponed till 1999 which his party lost.

References

Sri Lankan Buddhists
Chief Ministers of North Central Province, Sri Lanka
Members of the North Central Provincial Council
United National Party politicians
Living people
Year of birth missing (living people)
Place of birth missing (living people)
Sinhalese politicians